is the 23rd major single by the Japanese female idol group Cute. It is set to be released in Japan on November 6, 2013.

Background 
The CD single will be released in six versions: Limited Editions A, B, C, D and Regular Editions A, B. Both Regular Editions and the Limited Edition D are CD-only. The limited editions A, B, and C come with a DVD containing music videos, etc. All the limited editions are shipped sealed and include a serial-numbered entry card for the lottery to win a ticket to one of the single's launch events.

Track listing

Regular Edition A, Limited Editions A, B, C

Regular Edition B, Limited Edition D

Bonus 
Sealed into all the limited editions:
 Event ticket lottery card with a serial number

Charts

References

External links 
 
 

2013 singles
Japanese-language songs
Cute (Japanese idol group) songs
Songs written by Tsunku
Song recordings produced by Tsunku
Zetima Records singles
Electronic dance music songs
Torch songs